Polina is a 2016 French drama film directed by Valérie Müller and Angelin Preljocaj, based on the graphic novel Polina by Bastien Vivès. The film was screened as part of the Venice Days programme at the 73rd Venice International Film Festival.

Plot
As a child Polina auditions for ballet school and is accepted. She catches the eye of the head teacher and choreographer, Bojinski, who is particularly hard on her because he senses her talent.  However she continuously struggles with the rigidity of training for ballet and her own passion for dance.

Polina is accepted into the Bolshoi Ballet in Moscow which for years had been the dream of her teachers and family. However, after witnessing a different type of dance at a festival, Polina decides to go to Aix-en-Provence and audition for a modern dance school there alongside her boyfriend, Adrien. They are both accepted though she is warned that modern dance is very different from the classical training she is used to. Polina struggles with the choreography and is criticized for focusing on her work to the exclusion of everything else. During a rehearsal she injures her ankle and is quickly replaced by her understudy, Sonia, who begins an affair with Adrien. When Polina heals she asks for her role in the show back, but the choreographer, Liria, tells her she is not emotionally ready. Frustrated, Polina leaves the company.

Polina ends up in Antwerpen where she calls the number of the first dance company she sees. There she auditions for a strange man who tells her that since she is a dancer and they both know she can dance he wants her to make him feel something. The audition is unsuccessful and Polina leaves, but before she does she sees a man teaching dance to kids. Polina is unable to find work elsewhere. Starving and homeless she eventually is able to scrape up a waitressing job at a bar. She returns to the site of her unsuccessful audition and meets Karl, the dancer who teaches improv. She attends one of his classes and begins to enjoy dancing once more. Encouraged by Karl, Polina choreographs a duet for the two of them to dance.

Polina's father dies and she goes to Moscow where her mother tells her that her father always wanted her to be a great dancer. Polina returns to Antwerpen where she and Karl perform their piece for a programmer who books them into the Montpellier Festival.

Cast 
  as Polina
 Veronika Zhovnytska as young Polina
 Juliette Binoche as Liria Elsaj
 Aleksei Guskov as Bojinski
 Jérémie Bélingard as Karl
 Niels Schneider as Adrien
 Sergio Díaz as Sergio
 Miglen Mirtchev as Anton
 Kseniya Kutepova as Natalia
 Ambroise Divaret as Alex
 Oriana Jimenez as Svetlana

References

External links 
 

2016 films
2016 drama films
2010s French-language films
2010s Russian-language films
French drama films
Films based on French comics
French dance films
2010s dance films
2016 directorial debut films
2010s French films